Philomelus, Philomêlos or Philomenus  was a minor Greek demi-god, patron of husbandry, tillage/ploughing and agriculture. His name means 'friend of ease' from philos and mêlos.

Family 
Philomelus the son of Demeter and Iasion, and the brother of Plutus. His son Parias gave his name to the Parians and the city of Parion (a town in Mysia on the Hellespont).

Mythology 
Plutus was very wealthy, but would share none of his riches to his brother. Out of necessity, Philomenus bought two oxen, invented the wagon or plough, and supported himself by ploughing his fields and cultivating crops. His mother, admiring him for this, put him in the heavens as the constellation Boötes, his wagon or plough being the constellation Ursa Major.

Note

References 

 Gaius Julius Hyginus, Astronomica from The Myths of Hyginus translated and edited by Mary Grant. University of Kansas Publications in Humanistic Studies. Online version at the Topos Text Project.

External links
 

Greek gods
Agricultural gods
Children of Demeter